Branislav "Bane" Sekulić (29 October 1906 – 24 September 1968) was a Serbian football player and football manager.

Career
He began playing with the youth team of Javor Beograd before moving to Dušanovac. Being only 15 he became senior and the youngest but also best player at Karađorđe Beograd where he moved from Dušanovac along his brother Dragutin. SK Soko Beograd brought him next but he only played with the youth team while with them. Next he was spotted by SK Jugoslavija where he joined a generation of players such as Marjanović, Dragićević, Luburić and Đurić, winning with them the 1924 and 1925 Yugoslav Championships. He was characterised for having an impressive physical condition and for being very offensive, great sprinter, and having great ability for a center, besides being the owner of a powerful shot. His speciality was the volley shot which was curiously considered to be elegant and soft but very efficient. His talent was soon spotted by foreign clubs and he moved to France and later Switzerland where he represented SO Montpellier, Club Français, Grasshopper Club Zürich and Urania Genève Sport. When he returned to Yugoslavia he first joined SK Jugoslavija before moving to SK Jedinstvo Beograd. His healthy way of life allowed him to become one of the Yugoslav players with longest active playing career and to play with Jedinstvo in the championship until almost his 40s.

He was part of the Yugoslavia national football team that reached the semi-finals of the 1930 FIFA World Cup.

He coached Cibalia, Red Star Belgrade, FC Fribourg, Switzerland, RFC Liège and SC Young Fellows Juventus.

Honours
Playing career:

Club:
SK Jugoslavija
Yugoslav Championship (2)
Champion: 1924, 1925

National team:
Yugoslavia
Semi-finals of the 1930 FIFA World Cup

References

External links
Career story at Reprezentacija.rs

1906 births
1968 deaths
Serbian footballers
Yugoslav footballers
Yugoslavia international footballers
SK Jedinstvo Beograd players
SK Jugoslavija players
Montpellier HSC players
Yugoslav First League players
Serbian expatriate footballers
Expatriate footballers in France
1930 FIFA World Cup players
Footballers from Belgrade
Urania Genève Sport players
Yugoslav football managers
Serbian football managers
HNK Cibalia managers
Red Star Belgrade managers
FK Vojvodina managers
RFC Liège managers
SC Young Fellows Juventus managers
Switzerland national football team managers
Club Français players
Association football forwards
FC Fribourg managers